Euphorbia trichophylla is a species of plant in the family Euphorbiaceae. It is endemic to Madagascar.  Its natural habitats are subtropical or tropical high-altitude grassland and rocky areas. It is threatened by habitat loss.

References

Endemic flora of Madagascar
trichophylla
Plants described in 1883
Vulnerable plants
Taxonomy articles created by Polbot
Taxa named by John Gilbert Baker